, better known as , is a Japanese actress who was last represented by the talent agency, Oscar Promotion.

Filmography

TV series

Radio series

Films

Internet series

Stage

References

External links
 Profile at Be Amie 
  

Japanese actresses
1989 births
Living people
People from Tokyo